A National Paralympic Committee (NPC) is a national constituent of the worldwide Paralympic movement. Subject to the controls of the International Paralympic Committee (IPC), NPCs are responsible for organizing their people's participation in the Paralympic Games.

The Paralympic Games are a major international multi-sport event where athletes with physical disabilities compete; this includes athletes with mobility disabilities, amputations, blindness, and cerebral palsy. There are Winter and Summer Paralympic Games, which are held immediately following their respective Olympic Games, in the same host city.

As of 2022, there are 182 NPCs who are full members of the IPC and one NPC which is provisional member. Only NPCs in good standing may enter athletes in the Paralympic Games. Within countries, some NPCs serve as the national governing body for one or more sports, while others only act as the IPC member with responsibility for Paralympic Games.

List of NPCs by continent
There are five regional organizations:

Africa

Americas

Asia

Europe

Oceania

See also
 National Olympic Committee

References

External links
International Paralympic Committee